The Ultimate Fighting Championship (UFC) is a mixed martial arts (MMA) promotion, founded in 1993 by Art Davie and Rorion Gracie. The organization was purchased from its parent company SEG in 2001 by Zuffa LLC, a promotional company owned by Las Vegas casino magnates, Lorenzo and Frank Fertitta and managed by Dana White (current president of operations). Since its inception, and through its current Zuffa management, the UFC has remained one of the more dominant MMA promotions in the world, playing host to a wide field of MMA fighters.

This list provides an up-to-date roster of all fighters that represent Canada competing or have previously competed under the UFC promotional banner. Fighters are organized by weight class and within their weight class by their number of appearances inside the UFC. Fighter record and notable wins, achievements. Tournament participation and overall Canadian UFC/MMA records

World Extreme Cagefighting (WEC) was purchased by Zuffa in 2006 and officially merged under the UFC brand on January 1, 2011. All former WEC fighters have had their WEC record listed in place of their UFC record, starting with WEC 25 (the first WEC event under Zuffa). These records have been, and will be, continued as former WEC fighters move on in the UFC.

Strikeforce was purchased by Zuffa in 2011 and officially merged under the UFC brand on January 12, 2013. All former Strikeforce fighters have had their Strikeforce record listed in place of their UFC record, starting with Strikeforce Challengers: Wilcox vs. Damm (the first Strikeforce event under Zuffa). These records have been, and will be, continued as former Strikeforce fighters move on in the UFC.

Each fight record has four categories: wins, losses, draws, and no-contests (NC). All fight records in this article are displayed in that order, with fights resulting in a no-contest listed in parentheses.

Heavyweights (265 lb, 120 kg)

Light Heavyweights (205 lb, 93 kg)

Middleweights (185 lb, 84 kg)

Welterweights (170 lb, 77 kg)

Lightweights (155 lb, 70 kg)

Featherweights (145 lb, 65 kg)

Bantamweights (135 lb, 61 kg)

Flyweights (125 lb, 56 kg)

Woman's Featherweight (145 lb, 65 kg)

Woman's Bantamweight (135 lb, 61 kg)

Woman's Flyweight (125 lb, 56 kg)

Woman's Straw-weight (115 lb, 52 kg)

UFC Hall of Fame

Modern-era wing

Tournament participation

Canadian mixed martial artists have participated in the UFC's original tournament format as well as The Ultimate Fighter tournaments. Canada has produced 3 tournament Champion's and has made it to the Finals 9 times, Semi-finals 7 times and Quarter-finals 11 times. 4 fighters from Canada participated in the UFC's original tournaments(usually Openweight contests consisting of 3 fights in one night) and 25 Canadians have fought on The Ultimate Fighter(20 of the 25 received contracts to fight in the UFC). Canada has participated in 26 tournaments in total, placing or winning in 22 of them.

Canadian UFC Tournament combatants

Canadian TUF Tournament combatants

Canadian TUF Coaches

List Records

Most Knockout wins by Canadian MMA fighters
*All fighters included in this list

Most Submission wins by Canadian MMA fighters
*All fighters included in this list

Most Decision wins by Canadian MMA fighters
*All fighters included in this list

Most Finishes by Canadian MMA fighters
*All fighters included in this list

Longest Win-streak by Canadian MMA fighters
*All fighters included in this list

Most Fights by Canadian MMA fighters
*All fighters included in this list

Fastest Knockouts by a Canadian MMA fighter
*All fighters included in this list

Fastest Submissions by a Canadian MMA fighter
*All fighters included in this list

Most UFC Bonuses won by Canadian MMA fighters
*All fighters included in this list

Most Title fights in the UFC by Canadian MMA fighters
*All fighters included in this list

Most Fights in the UFC by Canadian MMA fighter
*All fighters included in this list

See also

List of current UFC fighters
List of UFC champions
List of UFC records
List of Pride FC alumni
List of current Bellator fighters
List of current WSOF-Global fighters
List of current Invicta FC fighters
List of current Rizin FF fighters
List of current PFL fighters
List of current ONE fighters
List of Pancrase champions
TKO Major League MMA
Prospect Fighting Championships

Notes

References

Canadian
Lists of mixed martial artists
UFC